"The Collier’s Rant" is a traditional Geordie folk song written many years ago (possibly around 1650), the writer is unknown.  It is one of the oldest mining songs in existence. It was already popular, and had been for how long we do not know, when Joseph Ritson published it in his Northumbrian Garland in 1793.  It is still a very popular piece by choirs throughout the North East of England.

Lyrics 

There have been mine disasters as long as coal has been mined, going back long before medieval times.  Some of these have been caused by gasses (the first reference to an explosion in a North East mine appears to have been in 1621), some by rock falls, and some by plain carelessness.

From early times the miners had viewed the pit with suspicion, and it was part folk lore, part fright, and part plain superstition, that many of the disasters had been attributed to the de’il (the devil) or his henchmen who lived at the bottom of the shaft in every pit.  This old north eastern song confirms the superstition.

The song appears in many publications including Joseph Cawhall’s “A beuk o’ Newcassel sangs” published in 1888:

Recordings
Thomas Allen from Songs of Northumbria – volume II (reference number MWMCDSP87). The song was arranged and conducted by David Haslam With the Northumbria Concert Orchestra & Chorus  The CD was recorded in 1993, and included 28 songs in total.

Appletwig Songbook recorded a version of The Collier’s Rant on The Miner’s Welfare (2012).

See also
Geordie dialect words

References

External links
Collier's Conrad Bladey's Beuk O' Newcassel Sangs
Traditional music
Google books
Clancy Brothers and Tommy Makem

Collier's Rant
Songs related to Newcastle upon Tyne
Collier's Rant
Collier's Rant
Songwriter unknown